Ozzie or Ozzy is a masculine given name, sometimes a short form (hypocorism) of Oswald, Oscar, Osborne, Osman and Ozymandias and other names, surname and nickname which may refer to:

Animals
 Ozzie (gorilla) (born c. 1961)

People
 Chris Osgood (born 1972), National Hockey League goaltender for the Detroit Red Wings
 Ray Ozzie (born 1955), former Chief Software Architect at Microsoft
 Oscar Ozzie Cadena (1924–2008), American record producer
 Osvaldo Ozzie Canseco (born 1964), Cuban-born former baseball player, brother of José Canseco
 Osborne Colson (1916–2006), Canadian figure skater and coach
 Osborne Cowles (1899-1997), American college basketball and football player and coach
 Oswaldo Ozzie Guillén (born 1964), Venezuelan former Major League Baseball player and manager
 Oscar Ozzy Lusth (born 1981), Survivor reality TV show contestant
 Michael Myers (Pennsylvania politician) (born 1943), American politician convicted for his part in the Abscam scandal
 Oswald Ozzie Nelson (1901-1975), American band leader, actor, director, and producer, best known for playing the father in the sitcom The Adventures of Ozzie and Harriet.
 Ozzie Newsome, American former National Football League player and current general manager of the Baltimore Ravens, member of the Hall of Fame
 Danny Ozzie Osborn (born 1946), American former Major League Baseball pitcher in 1975
 John Ozzy Osbourne (born 1948), English lead singer for heavy metal band Black Sabbath, songwriter and star of the reality TV show The Osbournes'
 Ozzie Silna (1932-2016), American businessman and basketball franchise co-owner
 Oze Ozzie Simmons (1914-2001), African-American college football player
 Osborne Ozzie Smith (born 1954), American retired Major League Baseball player and member of the Hall of Fame
 Ozzie Sweet (1918-2013), American sports photographer born Oscar Cowan Corbo
 Osborne Ozzie Timmons (born 1970), American former Major League Baseball player
 Osvaldo Ozzie Virgil, Sr. (born 1932), former Major League Baseball utility player from the Dominican Republic
 Osvaldo Ozzie Virgil, Jr. (born 1956), former Major League Baseball All-Star catcher from Puerto Rico
 Ozzie Albies (born 1997) is a Curaçaoan professional baseball for the Atlanta Braves of Major League Baseball (MLB).

Fictional characters
 Osvaldo "Ozzie" Don Altobello, main villain in the film The Godfather Part III, played by Eli Wallach
 Ozzie Mandrill, villain in computer adventure game Escape from Monkey Island Ozzie, Slash, and Flea, villains who serve Magus in the role-playing game Chrono Trigger Ozzie Fernandez Isaacs, creator of the wormholes technology and the gaïa field in the Commonwealth universe of Peter F Hamilton
 "My Ozzie," bachelor owner of Earl, the Jack Russell terrier in Mutts'', the comic strip
 Ozzie Graham, reporter who joins the StarCrossed group in the TV series People of Earth.
 Ozzy Delvecchio, character played by John Leguizamo in Bloodline (TV series).

See also
 Aussie, a slang term for Australian, both the adjective and the noun, and less commonly, Australia
 Ossi (disambiguation)
 Ossie, a given name

References

Masculine given names
Hypocorisms